Awesome Record, Great Songs! Volume One is a 2008 comedy album by Tim Heidecker and Eric Wareheim, collectively known as Tim & Eric, released on Williams Street Records. The album features many songs from the first and second seasons of their Adult Swim television series Tim and Eric Awesome Show, Great Job!, as well as additional skits. It features many of their frequent collaborators on the series, bands covering songs from the show such as Built to Spill and The Shins, and remixes, including one by Flying Lotus.

Notably a few songs are missing from the show that are not on this release, including "Cops and Robbers" by "Casey and his Brother" (from the episode "Salame") and "Funk Barn" by the "Jeff GoldBluMan Group" (from the episode "Innernette").

Track listing
All songs by Davin Wood, Eric Wareheim, and Tim Heidecker unless noted.

References

External links
"Awesome Record, Great Songs! Volume One" at Allmusic

Tim & Eric
2008 albums
2000s comedy albums
Williams Street Records albums
Tim Heidecker albums